Dancé may refer to the following places in France:

 Dancé, Loire, a commune in the Loire department
 Dancé, Orne, a commune in the Orne department

See also
 Dance (disambiguation)